"For My Dear..." is the fourth single released by Ayumi Hamasaki on October 7, 1998.

Track listing
 "For My Dear..."
 "For My Dear..." (Acoustic Version)
 "For My Dear..." (Instrumental)

Re-release
This single was re-released on February 28, 2001, including four new songs.

Track listing
 "For My Dear..."
 "For My Dear..." (Acoustic Version)
 "A Song for ××" (she shell Reproduction)
 "Friend II" (Jazzy Jet Mix)
 "As if…" (dub's L.B.M remix)
 "For My Dear..." (Inst.)
 "For My Dear..." (Acoustic Version Inst.)

Live performances
October 9, 1998 - Super Dream Live - For My Dear...
October 17, 1998 - Pop Jam - For My Dear...
October 24, 1998 - Countdown TV - For My Dear...
October 30, 1998 - Music Station - For My Dear...
November 9, 1998 - Hey! Hey! Hey! - For My Dear...

Music video

The music video of For My Dear... was directed by Odagami Hiromitsu. The video features Hamasaki sitting in a bar watching people come and go. The video then follows a few of the visitors as they leave. The video also switches to a heavens gate scene where Hamasaki sings.

 Producer: Hasegawa Toru (HAT)
 Director: Odagami Yoko (HAT)
 Production Manager: Sato Naoki (HAT)
 Director of Photography: Sakamoto Seigo
 Light: Nishiyama Yoshiharu
 Stylist: Matsumoto Koji
 Hair: Tamotsu (Too RUSTIC)
 Make Up: Chu (Too RUSTIC)

Success in the KL
Ayumi Hamasaki's For My Dear... was played on Traxx FM., the first Japanese song to do so.

Chart positions

1Original version
²Re-release version

Oricon sales: 74,440 (Original version)

References

External links
 For My Dear… information at Avex Network.
 For My Dear… re-release information at Avex Network.
 For My Dear… information at Oricon.
 For My Dear… re-release information at Oricon.

Ayumi Hamasaki songs
1998 singles
2001 singles
Songs written by Ayumi Hamasaki
1998 songs
Song recordings produced by Max Matsuura
Avex Trax singles